is the 26th single by Japanese entertainer Miho Nakayama. Written by Nakayama, Yūho Iwasato, and Toshifumi Hinata, the single was released on April 21, 1993, by King Records.

Background and release
"Shiawase ni Naru Tame ni" was used as the theme song of the NHK TV serial , marking the first time Nakayama recorded a theme song for a TV program she did not star in.

"Shiawase ni Naru Tame ni" peaked at No. 4 on Oricon's weekly singles chart. It sold over 414,000 copies and was certified Platinum by the RIAJ.

Nakayama performed the song on the 44th Kōhaku Uta Gassen in 1993.

Track listing

Charts
Weekly charts

Year-end charts

Certification

References

External links

1992 songs
1993 singles
Japanese-language songs
Miho Nakayama songs
King Records (Japan) singles